Platynota texana is a species of moth of the family Tortricidae. It is found in Texas, United States.

The wingspan is about 14 mm.

References

Moths described in 2012
Platynota (moth)